The Defence Council of the United Kingdom is the supreme governing body of the British Armed Forces. It was established by the Defence (Transfer of Functions) Act 1964, which statutorily delegated the military authority of the Crown, as head of the Armed Forces, to the Defence Council. It has the power of "command and administration" over the military.

The Defence Council consists of the Defence Board, its principal committee, as well as the Admiralty Board, the Army Board and the Air Force Board. The Defence Board is chaired by the secretary of state for defence, the minister of the crown with "general responsibly for defence" of the United Kingdom.

Functions
Prior to 1964, there were five government ministries responsible for the British Armed Forces: the Admiralty, the War Office, the Air Ministry, the Ministry of Aviation, and a smaller Ministry of Defence. By Orders-in-Council issued under the Defence (Transfer of Functions) Act 1964, the functions of these bodies were transferred to the Defence Council and the Secretary of State for Defence, who heads a larger Ministry of Defence.

The Secretary of State for Defence, who is a member of the Cabinet, chairs the Defence Council, and is accountable to the King and to Parliament for its business. The letters patent constituting the Defence Council vest it with the power of command over His Majesty's Forces and give it responsibility for their administration, or in the words of the letters patent:

In practice, the Defence Council is a formal body, and almost all its work is conducted by the Defence Board. In addition, the three service boards (the Admiralty Board, the Army Board and the Air Force Board), which are sub-committees of the Defence Council meet annually for each service chief to report to the Secretary of State on the health of their respective services.

Membership

Defence Board
The Defence Board is described as the highest committee of the Ministry of Defence, responsible for the full range of defence business other than the conduct of operations. It meets every month and provides strategic direction and oversight of defence matters.

References

External links 
 Ministry of Defence Our Governance

Ministry of Defence (United Kingdom)